National Secondary Route 207, or just Route 207 (or ) is a National Road Route of Costa Rica, located in the San José province.

Description
In San José province the route covers San José canton (San Francisco de Dos Ríos district), Desamparados canton (Desamparados, San Antonio districts).

References

Highways in Costa Rica